Puerto Rico Highway 176 (PR-176) is a main road in Cupey. It begins at its intersection with PR-175 near Carraízo Lake in Trujillo Alto and ends at PR-1 near downtown Río Piedras.

Major intersections

Related route

Puerto Rico Highway 8176 (PR-8176) is a road parallel to PR-176 in Cupey.

See also

 List of highways numbered 176

References

External links

 Carretera 176, San Juan, Puerto Rico

176